Fanzhen, also called fangzhen, was a system of decentralized governance in Medieval China that involved administration through highly autonomous regional governors known as jiedushi. The term fanzhen literally means "barrier town", and refers to the strategic military districts and commanderies along the empire's borderland areas. During the Tang dynasty, these districts came under the control of provincial military commissioners, who became ambitious secessionist warlords, rebels and even usurpers during the late Tang period. The phenomenon of fanzhen domination has been termed fanzhen geju (lit. "the breakaway of and occupation of territories by fanzhen) by historians.

As control of these fanzhen devolved from central authority into the hands of the local leaders, they at times became powerful enough to threaten the imperial court (618–907 CE), particularly during and after the An Lushan Rebellion. An Lushan, the provincial governor and military commander who started this rebellion against the Emperor Xuanzong of Tang, in 755 CE, went so far as to proclaim himself emperor, in 756 CE, but, was killed by his own son in the following year and Tang power was re-established by 763 CE. The An Lushan Rebellion allowed many jiedushi on the periphery of the Tang Empire to gain significant autonomy with many becoming warlords in all but name. Subsequent Tang emperors were met with lukewarm success in curtailing the power of these fanzhen, in particular, the Emperor Dezong of Tang (r. 779–805 CE) who was driven from his capital, Chang'an, after an unsuccessful attempt to subjugate them. The subsequent Emperor Xianzong of Tang (r. 805–820 CE) was able to suppress some fanzhen but at the cost of further empowering the eunuchs who had come to dominate the life of the imperial court. Xianzong died in 820 CE, possibly as a result of assassination, and his successors were unable to stop the dynasty's decline. The ambitions of the jiedushi, in tandem with the corruption of the imperial court eunuchs who dominated the central civil administration and even attained high military command during the late Tang, contributed to the disintegration of the Tang Empire. A brief resurgence under the emperors Wuzong and Xuānzong failed to halt the decentralization of state power, and the Tang Empire collapsed following a further series of major peasant uprisings such as the Wang Xianzhi and Huang Chao rebellions.

After the collapse of the Tang dynasty in 907, numerous fanzhen that did not wish to submit to the new Later Liang dynasty declared independence, thereby forming several of the Ten Kingdoms during the chaotic Five Dynasties and Ten Kingdoms period.

Parallels have been made between the rise of the fanzhen in Tang China and the rise of feudalism in medieval Europe following the decline of the Carolingian Empire.

See also
Three Fanzhen of Hebei

References

Administrative divisions of the Tang dynasty